E27 or E-27 may refer to:
 European route E27
 E27 screw, 27 mm Edison screw light bulb cap
 HMS E27, a British submarine
 Maizuru-Wakasa Expressway, route E27 in Japan
 East Klang Valley Expressway, route E27 in Malaysia